Dylan Westbrook (born December 10, 1998) is a Canadian professional dirt track racing driver who competes full-time in the Lucas Oil American Sprint Car Series

Motorsports career results

NASCAR
(key) (Bold – Pole position awarded by qualifying time. Italics – Pole position earned by points standings or practice time. * – Most laps led.)

Camping World Truck Series

 Season still in progress

References

External links
 

1998 births
NASCAR drivers
Canadian racing drivers
Racing drivers from Ontario
Living people